Carioca Arena 2 (Portuguese: Arena Carioca 2) is an indoor stadium in Barra da Tijuca in the west zone of Rio de Janeiro, Brazil. The venue hosted judo and wrestling at the 2016 Summer Olympics as well as boccia at the 2016 Summer Paralympics. As with a number of other venues in the Barra Olympic Park, Carioca Arena 2 will be transformed after the games to become part of the Olympic Training Centre.

See also
 Carioca Arena 1
 Carioca Arena 3

References

Indoor arenas in Brazil
Sports venues in Rio de Janeiro (city)
Barra Olympic Park
Sports venues completed in 2016